The Asia Power Sapugaskanda Power Station (also sometimes referred to as Asia Power Station) is a  thermal power station in Sapugaskanda, Sri Lanka. Planning for the fuel oil-run power station dated back to 1994, when the Ceylon Electricity Board issued a tender for an IPP project for 50 megawatts. Construction of the plant began in 1996 and was commissioned in June 1998, with a PPA of 20-years. The power station utilizes eight  generating units.

See also 
 Sapugaskanda Power Station
 Lakdhanavi Power Station
 List of power stations in Sri Lanka

References

External links 
 

Oil-fired power stations in Sri Lanka
Buildings and structures in Gampaha District